
A leak is a way for matter to escape a container.

Leak may also refer to:

Information leaks
 News leak, the unsanctioned release of confidential information to news media
 Data leak
 Internet leak, a release of confidential information on the Internet
 Music leak, the unauthorized release of music on the Internet

People
 Leak (surname), a list of people with the family name Leak or Leaks

Arts, entertainment, and media

Films
 Leak (film), a 2000 Dutch thriller
The Leak (1917, short film), directed by William Beaudine with Billy Franey, Milburn Morante, Lillian Peacock

Music
 The Leak (2007), a recording by hip hop artist Lil Wayne
 The Leak, an album by Blades (hip hop group)

Other uses
 LEAK, a brand name for high-fidelity audio equipment
 Leak, a slang term for the drug phencyclidine (PCP)
 Leak, a slang term for urination

See also
Leak detection
 Leyak, mythological figure in Balinese mythology
 Leakage (disambiguation)
 Leake (disambiguation)
 Leek (disambiguation)